"Show the World" is a song by the first Danish X Factor winner, Martin.  It is the second single off his same-titled debut album, Show the World (2008).  It was written by the Danish songwriting and production team of Thomas Troelsen, Remee and Lucas Secon. Martin's singing has been compared to Michael Jackson and Justin Timberlake.

Charts and certifications

! scope="row"|Denmark (IFPI Denmark)
|Platinum
|15,000
|}

Love Like Oxygen

In 2008, South Korean boy band Shinee recorded a remake version of the song in Korean as "Love Like Oxygen" (Korean:"산소 같은 너 (Love Like Oxygen). It was released as the first single from The Shinee World (2008).

Music video
The music video consist of the boys dancing in a white room, wearing colorful outfits at first and then black and white outfits near the end. It switches from scenes to the boys in a club having individual shots of their solo parts. The dance was choreographed by Japanese dancer Rino Nakasone-Razalan.

Release
SM Entertainment promoted "Love Like Oxygen" as the group's debut single outside of South Korea. The group travelled to Thailand in November 2008, where the single reached number one (as well as the album). The single continued to be released throughout Asia into early 2009.  The single and album were also released in Taiwan.

Track listing

Accolades

References

2008 singles
Songs written by Thomas Troelsen
Shinee songs
SM Entertainment singles
Korean-language songs
Songs written by Lucas Secon
Songs written by Remee
2008 songs